Vincenzo Sinagra (born 1 January 1956) is a former associate of the Sicilian Mafia who became a significant pentito.

Sinagra was not actually a member of the Mafia but just a petty criminal, one of fourteen children to a fisherman from Palermo. In 1981 he made the mistake of robbing a member of the Mafia and although this would normally have meant instant death, because he had a cousin in the Mafia (see below) he was given a choice of leaving Sicily, being killed, or becoming a gofer and bagman for the Mafia. He chose the third option.

During the Mafia War of the early 1980s, Sinagra worked for Filippo Marchese, a ruthless killer who employed Sinagra for various menial tasks, like holding the feet of Marchese's victims whilst Marchese strangled them, and helping dispose of bodies. Sinagra used to take home $250 a month in his grisly job, waiting around on street corners for his next assignment.

He was sent to carry out a contract killing on August 11, 1982, but he bungled it badly. His gun jammed and so his accomplice, his cousin, had to shoot the victim dead. Sinagra then left his weapon in the getaway car. He and his cousin were arrested later that day.

In prison, Sinagra feigned insanity but eventually suffered something of a nervous breakdown, apparently wracked with guilt for taking part in many murders. He eventually became an informant and provided anti-Mafia judge Paolo Borsellino with a great deal of information. Borsellino had been after Marchese for years. Sinagra even led the police on a tour of his clan's torture chamber. There he showed them bloodstained ropes, brickbats and a vat in which bodies were dumped into acid.

By the end of 1982, Marchese was dead, killed on the orders of Salvatore Riina who decided Marchese was of no further use. However, Sinagra did eventually testify at the Maxi Trial of 1986-1987, along with other informants like Tommaso Buscetta, and helped convict many Mafiosi.

Despite his cooperation, at the conclusion of the Maxi Trial, Sinagra was handed a twenty-one-year sentence for his part in multiple murders. He was released in 2008.

Vincenzo Sinagra was also the name of the above individual's cousin. This Vincenzo, who was a fully fledged member of the Mafia, was nicknamed "Tempest" due to his violent temper and strength. At the Maxi Trial, "Tempest", partly on the testimony of his cousin, was convicted of murder as part of the Maxi Trial and imprisoned for life.

References

Sources

Sinagra, Vincenzo
Sinagra, Vincenzo
Sinagra, Vincenzo